The College of Piping and Celtic Performing Arts of Canada, established in 1990 in Summerside, Prince Edward Island, Canada, is an international school teaching Highland bagpiping, Scottish-style snare drumming, Highland Dancing and Island step dancing. General (Ret'd) John de Chastelain was a director at the College. The College of Piping is the most prestigious piping organisation on Prince Edward Island. The College has won 5th place in Grade 3B at the 2012 World Pipe Band Championships and 4th place in Grade 3b at the 2007 World Pipe Band Championships. In addition to these accomplishments are numerous awards from Atlantic Canada, Quebec and the Eastern United States. Many of the members of The College of Piping Pipe Bands are also award-winning soloists, bringing home local, regional, national and international prizes for their respective grade.

Currently the College has three competitive pipe bands. These bands are registered with The Atlantic Canada Pipe Band Association (ACPBA) as grades 2, 4, and 5. The College of Piping Pipe Bands are under the direction of Pipe Major James MacHattie, Pipe Sgt. Kylie MacHattie and Drum Sgt. Chris Coleman. In 2014 The College of Piping will be sending their grade 3 and 4 to Scotland to compete at The World Pipe Band Championships.

See also
Canntaireachd
World Pipe Band Championships
Great Highland Bagpipe
List of bagpipers
List of pipe band associations
List of pipe bands
Pipe band
Royal Scottish Pipe Band Association
Types of bagpipes

External links 
 The College of Piping and Celtic Performing Arts of Canada
 Military Tattoo 
 Pipefest - The Home of Massed Pipe Bands
 pipes|drums online magazine
 Online bagpipe lessons

Bagpiping schools
Pipe bands
Scottish music